The GLAAD Media Award for Outstanding Video Game is an annual award that honors video games for excellence in the depiction of LGBT (lesbian, gay, bisexual, and transgender) characters and themes. It is one of several categories of the annual GLAAD Media Awards, which are presented by GLAAD—an American non-governmental media monitoring organization founded in 1985, formerly called the Gay & Lesbian Alliance Against Defamation—at ceremonies in New York City; Los Angeles; and San Francisco between March and June.

The award was first given at the 30th GLAAD Media Awards in 2019 to The Elder Scrolls Online: Summerset, an expansion pack developed by ZeniMax Online Studios and published by Bethesda Softworks for The Elder Scrolls Online. The 32nd ceremony in 2021 marks the only instance where a tie has occurred, with The Last of Us Part II (developed by Naughty Dog and published by Sony Interactive Entertainment) and Tell Me Why (developed by Dontnod Entertainment and published by Xbox Game Studios) both winning the award.

For a video game to be eligible, it must contain "outstanding LGBTQ-inclusive content", consisting of LGBT characters and stories that are "authentic and impactful". An important criterion is to what extent the LGBT-inclusive content is integrated into the gameplay, specifically in regard to player agency and the game's world. Said LGBT-inclusive content must be revealed either within the game itself, or alternate media that are canonical to the game's world. Since 2021, only video games from major developers and publishers are eligible as standard, although a game from non-major developers and publishers can still be nominated if it achieves a similar level of visibility and impact to a mainstream work. If a game was released prior to the eligibility period, it can still be nominated if "substantial new first-party content" is released during the eligibility period, with said content being evaluated.

Video games selected by GLAAD are evaluated based on four criteria: "Fair, Accurate, and Inclusive Representations" of the LGBT community, "Boldness and Originality" of the project, significant "Impact" on mainstream culture, and "Overall Quality" of the project. GLAAD monitors mainstream media to identify which video games will be nominated, while also issuing a Call for Entries that encourages media outlets to submit games for consideration. Video games created by and for an LGBT audience must be submitted in order to be considered for nomination, as GLAAD does not monitor such works for defamation. Winners are determined by a plurality vote by GLAAD staff and board, Shareholders Circle members, as well as volunteers and affiliated individuals.

The award has received some criticism, especially during 2019 and 2020, for its emphasis on mainstream Triple-A video games, which is often viewed as occurring at the expense of indie ones. Furthermore, criticism has also been aimed at the fact many of the mainstream games nominated contained minimal levels of LGBT-inclusive content and representation. Since its inception, the award has been given to five video games. At the 33rd GLAAD Media Awards in 2022, the award was given to Life Is Strange: True Colors, developed by Deck Nine and published by Square Enix.

Background
In September 2018, GLAAD announced the introduction of a category at the GLAAD Media Awards for recognizing video games. According to Zeke Stokes, the Vice President of Programs, GLAAD had been interested in the video game medium for years. Some of the factors that led to the creation of the Outstanding Video Game category were, according to Stokes, 2017 being a turning point in the industry—given the plethora of LGBT-inclusive video games released in that year—as well as video games being one of the primary sources of entertainment for youngsters.

Stokes acknowledged that in contrast to films and television series, video games and especially Triple-A games rarely include LGBTQ characters and themes. While independent games are more inclusive of such content, GLAAD is interested in Triple-A games including LGBT themes, especially given the size of the industry. Prior to announcing the creation of the category, GLAAD had consulted various gaming studios, to ensure that the category would have "weight and meaning and attract submissions to give the industry an optimistic path forward".

In January 2019, GLAAD announced the inaugural Outstanding Video Game nominees, one of which was Assassin's Creed Odyssey. The game's Legacy of the First Blade downloadable content attracted controversy for featuring a storyline placing the player character Alexios or Kassandra in an unavoidable heterosexual relationship that results in an offspring. In a statement addressing the game's inclusion, GLAAD's Associate Director of Gaming Blair Durkee also criticized the storyline for giving the impression that sexual orientation can be changed and that LGBT individuals can "choose to conform to heteronormative expectations in spite of their identities". However, she defended the nomination of Assassin's Creed Odyssey, acknowledging that progress can be complicated and that in order to motivate video game developers and publishers to continue making "these types of bold moves in the future, we must allow for growth, acknowledge that missteps do occur, and give proper credit where credit is due".

Winners and nominees

Criticism
Following the category's announcement, Polygons Owen S. Good lamented that, given the award's eligibility criteria, indie games inclusive of LGBT characters and themes such as Tacoma, Butterfly Soup, and Dream Daddy could not be nominated. CJ Adriessen of Destructoid was disappointed by the inaugural nominees in 2019, arguing that The Missing: J.J. Macfield and the Island of Memories deserved a nomination given its positive and respectful representation of trans people, and described the game's exclusion as having "le[ft] a rotten taste in [his] mouth".

Also discussing the category's inaugural nominees, Jay Castello of Rock Paper Shotgun criticized the inclusion of Assassin's Creed Odyssey, particularly in light of its Legacy of the First Blade DLC. Castello argued that—especially given GLAAD's own criticisms of the DLC—Odyssey "wasn't, in fact, 'outstanding, pointing out that all optional love interests in it are playersexual, and how the game does not offer enough same-sex options for Alexios. Furthermore, they argued that indie games such as Heaven Will Be Mine and Hardcoded, which deal heavily with LGBT themes and are made by LGBTQ+ people—unlike Assassin's Creed Odyssey and The Elder Scrolls Online: Summerset—were more deserving of recognition.

Imogen Beckhelling, also of Rock Paper Shotgun, would go on to criticize the 2020 nominees, arguing that it is still "missing the point", pointing out how in Overwatch both Tracer and Soldier: 76 are revealed to be queer only in the tie-in comics, outside of the game. While Beckhelling believed that LGBT representation in video games is important, and progress in Triple-A games should be celebrated, she argued that indie games deserve more recognition, singling out Heart of the Woods for praise.

Regarding the 2022 ceremony, Jade King described the nominees as consisting of "both triple-A titles and indie hits". While King acknowledged some of the nominees' representation was minimal and the games were included likely to "make up the numbers", she recognized that progress is not a linear process, and described the list as being well-founded.

Notes

References

Awards for best video game
GLAAD Media Awards